The Forest Heritage Scenic Byway is a  National Forest Scenic Byway, National Scenic Byway and North Carolina Scenic Byway that traverses through the Pisgah National Forest, in Western North Carolina.  It features the Cradle of Forestry, waterfalls, trails and scenic vistas.

Route description
The scenic byway begins at the intersection of  US 64 and NC 215, near Rosman (el. ).  Traveling north, along the banks of the North Fork French Broad River, it reaches the Balsam Grove community; there, access to Courthouse Falls can be reach via Forest Road 140.  At Pinhook Gap (el. ) the scenic byway enters through a small stretch of Jackson County before returning into Transylvania County.  At Beech Gap (el.  and highest point), the scenic byway enters Haywood County and connects with the Blue Ridge Parkway.  Descending from the Pisgah Ridge, it soon follows the West Fork Pigeon River to Lake Logan (el. ); where originally existed a logging town known as Sunburst, until a devastating wildfire in 1925 closed the mill and then it was submerged by the lake in 1933.

In Woodrow (el. ), named for President Woodrow Wilson, the scenic byway switches from NC 215 onto US 276 towards Brevard.  The scenic byway, now following the East Fork Pigeon River, slowly ascends between Cold Mountain and Mount Pisgah.  At Shining Creek Gap (el. ) is where the Shining Rock Trail Head is located and the beginning of the National Scenic Byway; making a curve and crossing over the East Fork Pigeon River, the scenic byway now quickly climbs up the Pisgah Ridge again.  Crossing back into Transylvania County at Wagon Road Gap (el. ), it connects again with the Blue Ridge Parkway before making a switchback descent into the Pink Beds.

The Pink Beds is an upland bog with dense growth of pink blooming rhododendrons and laurels.  Located nearby is the Cradle of Forestry, where the very first school of forestry, the Biltmore Forest School, was founded by Carl A. Schenck in 1898.  Three miles south from the Cradle of Forestry is Sliding Rock (el. ), a popular summertime location where visitors can get cool by sliding on rocks and into the pool below.  Nearby is Looking Glass Falls, named by the mountain its on, the water appears like a mirror gleaming off its granite face.  The Pisgah Forest National Fish Hatchery, located in the former logging camp of John Rock and along the Davidson River, is where trout is raised and released in the area rivers.

Near Brevard is the Pisgah Visitor Center, where once stood a community around the Sycamore Flats area(el. ) and stands the historic English Chapel (1860-1940).  Visitors may also see a pair of stone pillars, which were built to honor Transylvania County residents who served in World War I and also mark the border of the Pisgah National Forest.  At the intersection of US 64/US 276 and NC 280, both the North Carolina Scenic Byway and National Scenic Byway ends; the National Forest Scenic Byway, however, continues along US 64, through Brevard, to meet back with NC 215 to make a complete loop.  Despite the overlap along US 64, no byway signage is marked along this section.

A majority of the scenic byway was built along former railroad tracks that were used for logging operations in the area in the late 19th and early 20th century.

Each byway varies in length and general focus.  The National Forest Scenic Byway is the longest and makes a loop along NC 215, US 276 and US 64 (as shown in article).  The National Scenic Byway is the shortest with  along US 276.  The North Carolina Scenic Byway is  along NC 215 and US 276.

History
The Forest Heritage Scenic Byway was established in 1989 as a United States Forest Service (USFS); in 1990, it also became a North Carolina Scenic Byway.  In 2009, part of US 276 portion of the scenic byway was also designated as a National Scenic Byway, by the United States Department of Transportation (USDOT).

Junction list

See also

 Cherohala Skyway
 Foothills Parkway
 Mountain Waters Scenic Byway
 North Carolina Bicycle Route 8

References

External links
 
 Forest Heritage National Scenic Byway
 National Forests in North Carolina

National Scenic Byways
National Forest Scenic Byways
Transportation in Transylvania County, North Carolina
Tourist attractions in Transylvania County, North Carolina
Transportation in Jackson County, North Carolina
Tourist attractions in Jackson County, North Carolina
Transportation in Haywood County, North Carolina
Tourist attractions in Haywood County, North Carolina
History of forestry in the United States
Biltmore Forest School